Dorota Maria Skowron is a scientist at the University of Warsaw. In 2019 she was part of the team that confirmed that the Milky Way galaxy was not flat. She is a member of the International Astronomical Union.

References

External links 
Dorota Skowron's research works | University of Warsaw, Warsaw (UW) and other places
NASA ADS.
astro-ph.

Living people
Year of birth missing (living people)
University of Warsaw alumni
Academic staff of the University of Warsaw
Polish women academics
Polish women scientists
Place of birth missing (living people)
21st-century Polish astronomers
Women astronomers